The 2011 IIHF Challenge Cup of Asia was the 4th IIHF Challenge Cup of Asia, an annual international ice hockey tournament held by the International Ice Hockey Federation (IIHF). It took place between April 25 and April 30, 2011 in Kuwait City, Kuwait. Last years winner, Chinese Taipei did not field a team to defend their title. The tournament was won by Hong Kong, who claimed their first title after winning all five of their games.

Overview
The 2011 IIHF Challenge Cup of Asia began on April 25, 2011 in Kuwait City, Kuwait. The first game was played between Thailand and India with Thailand winning the game 29–0. Hong Kong won the tournament winning all five games against the opposing nations, claiming their first title. Hong Kong had previously won bronze at 2008 IIHF Challenge Cup of Asia, which had been their best result to date. The United Arab Emirates finished second, losing only to Hong Kong in their five games and Thailand finished third after losing to Hong Kong and the United Arab Emirates. Hosts, Kuwait, finished fourth with wins over Macau and India. The game between Kuwait and India finished 39–2. It was recorded as Kuwait's largest win in international ice hockey as well as India's first time they had scored multiple goals in a game. India has previously only managed to score one goal in a game against Malaysia at the 2009 IIHF Challenge Cup of Asia.

Standings

Fixtures
All times local.

Tournament awards
Best players selected by the directorate:
Best Goaltender:  King Chi Ho
Best Defenceman:  Likit Neimwan
Best Forward:  Juma Al Dhaheri
Most Valuable Player:  Jasper Tang
Best Coach:  Dong Yan

References

External links
International Ice Hockey Federation

Chal
2011 in Kuwaiti sport
2011
International ice hockey competitions hosted by Kuwait